Shaking Man is a 1993 bronze sculpture by Terry Allen, installed at Yerba Buena Gardens, in San Francisco's South of Market neighborhood, in the U.S. state of California.

Description and history
The bronze statue depicts an executive wearing business attire, and measures approximately 5 ft. 5 in. x 2 ft. 6 in. x 2 ft. 6 in. The sculpture's plaque reads: "Shaking Man / Terry Allen / 1993 / Collection of the / San Francisco Redevelopment Agency."

Shaking Man was completed in October 1993, and surveyed by the Smithsonian Institution's "Save Outdoor Sculpture!" program in 1993.

See also

 1993 in art

References

1993 sculptures
Bronze sculptures in California
Outdoor sculptures in San Francisco
Sculptures of men in California
South of Market, San Francisco
Statues in California